Sir Christopher William Codrington (12 March 1805 – 24 June 1864), of Dodington, Gloucestershire, was a British MP for East Gloucestershire between 7 August 1834 and 24 June 1864 and a landowner in Gloucestershire.

Codrington was first elected to the House of Commons in a by-election on 7 August 1834, to replace Sir Berkeley Guise, 2nd Baronet (who had died 23 July 1834) as one of the two members for the East Gloucestershire parliamentary constituency. He was re-elected on 10 January 1835, on 5 July 1841, on 27 February 1847 (with his young brother-in-law the Marquess of Worcester), in 1852 again with Worcester.  When Worcester's father died in 1853, he became 8th Duke of Beaufort and was translated to the House of Lords.  His seat was then filled briefly by Sir Michael Hicks-Beach, 8th Baronet between 9 January 1854 and 29 November 1854 when Hicks-Beach died.  A second by-election on 19 December 1854 resulted in the election of Robert Stayner Holford, a wealthy landowner and dilettante, as the second member. Codrington and Holford represented East Gloucestershire for the next ten years, until Codrington's own death.

Family
Codrington was the eldest son of Christopher Bethell-Codrington (died 1843), of Doddington Park, Gloucestershire, since 1764, and the grandson of Edward Codrington. The elder Christopher had inherited Dodington Park from a relative who disinherited his son; he was required to change his name to Bethell-Codrington (thus his son is also sometimes known as Christopher Bethell-Codrington).  His mother was the Hon. Harriet Foley (d. 1843) daughter of Thomas Foley, 2nd Baron Foley of Kidderminster (1742–1793) by his wife Lady Henrietta Stanhope, herself daughter of the Earl of Harrington. Through his maternal grandmother, Codrington was thus connected to the earls of Sefton, the barons Penrhyn and landed gentry families.

In 1836, Codrington married Lady Georgiana Charlotte Anne Somerset (1817–1884), second daughter of Henry Somerset, 7th Duke of Beaufort, and younger daughter by his first wife Georgiana Frederica Fitzroy (d. 1821), a niece of the Duke of Wellington. Georgiana's paternal ancestors included the Schuyler family, the Van Cortlandt family and the Delancey family of British North America. They had issue 
 Sir Gerald William Henry Codrington, 1st Bt., of Dodington Park (1850–1929), married in 1887 his first half-cousin maternally, Lady Edith Henrietta Sybil Denison (d. 1945), daughter of William Henry Forester Denison, 1st Earl of Londesborough by his wife Lady Edith Frances Wilhelmina Somerset (1838–1915), youngest daughter of the 7th Duke of Beaufort. They had issue.
 Captain George John Granville Christopher Codrington (1855–1932).
 Alice Emily Georgiana Olivia Codrington (d. 1920), who married 1891 Sir Henry Mervyn Vavasour, 3rd Bt., of Spalington (1814–1912), son and heir of Sir Henry Maghull Mervin Vavasour, 2nd Bt., and had issue, one daughter.  With his death without surviving heirs male, the baronetcy created in 1801 became extinct in the third generation.

Codrington's elder son Gerald was created a baronet in 1876.

See also
Codrington baronets

References

External links 
 
 Descendants of Sir Christopher William Codrington
 Descent of Sir Christopher William Codrington from the Bethells showing the older baronetcy created 1721 for the eventually disinherited senior line.

Members of the Parliament of the United Kingdom for English constituencies
UK MPs 1832–1835
UK MPs 1835–1837
UK MPs 1837–1841
UK MPs 1841–1847
UK MPs 1847–1852
UK MPs 1852–1857
UK MPs 1857–1859
UK MPs 1859–1865
1805 births
1864 deaths
People from South Gloucestershire District
Codrington family